Csaba Ali (4 November 1946 – 27 December 2020) was a Hungarian swimmer. He competed in two events at the 1964 Summer Olympics.

References

External links
 

1946 births
2020 deaths
Hungarian male swimmers
Olympic swimmers of Hungary
Swimmers at the 1964 Summer Olympics
Sportspeople from Eger